Carlos Alberto Wahnon de Carvalho Veiga (born October 21, 1949 in Mindelo) is a Cape Verdean politician. He was Prime Minister of Cape Verde from April 4, 1991 to July 29, 2000.

Early life and education
In 1950, Veiga was born in Mindelo, São Vicente. He later attended school in Praia on the island of Santiago, and later, he graduated in 1971 from the University of Lisbon with a degree in law. Veiga's Jewish maternal grandfather immigrated to Cape Verde from Gibraltar in the 1940s. He is Cape Verde's first ambassador to Israel of Jewish descent.

Career
After briefly living in Angola from 1972 to 1974, Veiga returned to Cape Verde in 1975, the year that it became independent, to join the African Party for the Independence of Guinea and Cape Verde (PAIGC). During his time in the PAIGC, Veiga served the Ministry of Public Administration from 1975 to 1980 as a judge. After leaving the African Party for the Independence of Cape Verde, he resumed his legal career and led the bar of Cape Verde from 1982 to 1986.

Politics
In 1985, Veiga was elected to the National Assembly as an independent candidate. Later, in 1989, Veiga was selected to become the president for the Movement for Democracy Party. After the 1991 elections, the Prime Minister of Cape Verde, Pedro Pires stepped down and Veiga took his place.

Veiga served as Prime Minister under President António Mascarenhas Monteiro, and resigned in July 2000 in order to stand as the MpD's candidate in the 2001 presidential election. He was succeeded as Prime Minister by Gualberto do Rosário.

In the 2001 presidential election, Veiga lost by 17 votes to Pedro Pires of the African Party for the Independence of Cape Verde (PAICV) in the second round of voting. He ran again for president in the 2006 presidential election, but he was defeated again by Pires. He ran for president a third time in the 2021 presidential election, and lost to José Maria Neves in the first round.

References

External links 
 Official website for the legislative elections of 2011
 Biography of Carlos Veiga 

1949 births
Living people
People from Mindelo
Cape Verdean people of Jewish descent
Movement for Democracy (Cape Verde) politicians
Prime Ministers of Cape Verde